Tarkio College was a college that operated in Tarkio, Missouri, from 1883 to 1992. The institution was supported by the United Presbyterian Church in the United States of America, followed by the Presbyterian Church (USA).

It was closed after filing for bankruptcy protection in 1991 and then was reopened in 2012 as a continuing education institution for professionals.

History
Samuel C. Marshall was the first president and William E. Walker served as the last president.

The Tarkio College mascot was the owl.  The school colors were purple and white, and the college's motto, often attributed to its founder, wealthy farmer David Rankin, was "Set Fire, Tarkio!"

One of the school's most famous structures was the Mule Barn Theatre, an octagon-shaped structure used originally to house mules.  It was on the National Register of Historic Places but was destroyed by fire in 1989.

After Tarkio College closed, the library books were purchased by and moved to Lancaster Bible College, Lancaster, Pennsylvania.  There were also several attempts to find alternative uses for the property, including early discussions about the possible founding of a new institution, Tarkio Valley College.  Initially, Youth Services International, Inc. operated Tarkio Academy, a residential and community-based educational program for juveniles between 1995 and 2004. North Central Missouri College and Linn State College (called State Technical College of Missouri since July 2014) in Linn, Missouri, then announced an exploration of options for a new jointly operated technical college in early 2006.  This was soon followed by reports that the property would become the Midwest Institute of Energy, a private college.  The institute missed its planned opening of 2009.

The Tarkio College Alumni Association preserved the original Tarkio College 1883 corporation and began the process to reopen the college in 2012 with a revised mission of providing continuing education for professionals as mandated for them by various state agencies, licensing boards or accrediting agencies. It does not provide academic credits at this time. Education and training will be available at locations throughout the United States as traditional seminars, online classes, interactive webinars—and also at the home campus in Tarkio, MO.  The Alumni Association has rented the main building on the Tarkio campus, Rankin Hall, and is in the process of restoring this 1931 landmark. Robert A. Hughes, Tarkio College Class of 1971, is the current president of the newly reorganized college.

Effective September 2019, Tarkio College Inc. has been issued a Certificate of Operation from the Missouri Department of Higher Education.  Operating as Tarkio Technology Institute, TTI or Tarkio Tech, as it is known locally offers technical certification courses for professionals in Plumbing, Wind Energy, and Welding.

January 6, 2020 ushered in a new era of education on the Tarkio College campus as it welcomed its first student in the welding program which, due to the small class size, was able to complete the program in 1 semester.  During the summer semesters, Tarkio Tech is able to offer the full program in an intense 13 week program.  The fall of 2020 marked the first official full year of classes in the 3 program areas originally approved by the state in September 2019.

New programs are being added for the 2021 school year to include HVAC training as well as computer repair and maintenance.  Programs will continually be added as Tarkio Tech continues to expand the programs offered to meet the regional employment needs in the four state area and beyond.

Educational records
After the college closed, student transcript records were transferred to Northwest Missouri State University.

Athletics
The Tarkio athletic teams were called the Owls. The college was a member of the National Association of Intercollegiate Athletics (NAIA), primarily competing in the Heart of America Athletic Conference (HAAC) from 1971–72 to 1991–92. The Owls previously competed in the Missouri College Athletic Union (MCAU) from 1924–25 to 1970–71.

Accomplishments
Tarkio College won the first NAIA Division I Men's basketball championship in 1940, defeating San Diego State 52–31. Tarkio College's 's softball team appeared in one Women's College World Series in 1976.

Notable alumni
 Tarkio College alumnus Wallace Hume Carothers (1896–1937) obtained his four-year degree at Tarkio College.  He later taught at Harvard University and is credited with the discovery of the artificial polymers nylon and neoprene.
 Another chemist, Carl Djerassi, attended Tarkio College shortly after his arrival in the U.S. as a refugee from Nazi-controlled Vienna. He completed his undergraduate education at Kenyon College, then got his PhD from the University of Wisconsin.
 Anthropologist Edgar Lee Hewett (1865–1946) received his degree in pedagogy from Tarkio College.  He is remembered for helping to bring about the Antiquities Act that enabled preservation of archaeological sites as United States national monuments.  He was also the first president of the New Mexico Normal School, whose current name is New Mexico Highlands University.
 US Senator and 2016 presidential candidate Marco Rubio (R-FL) attended the college for one year on a football scholarship before moving on to Santa Fe College in Florida.
 Tarkio alumnus Allen Reynolds graduated in 1960 and went on to play professional football with the Dallas Texans 1960–62. The team moved to Kansas City where he played with the Kansas City Chiefs 1963–67. He was number 60 and played offensive right guard.
 John H. Eastwood was a chaplain in the United States Army 464th Bombardment Group during World War II.
 Neil M. Stevenson, former Chief of Chaplains of the United States Navy.

References

External links
 Tarkio College website
 Tarkio College Alumni Association
 First Bank v. Tarkio College – bankruptcy decision from the U.S. eighth Circuit Court of Appeals
 ''A College Acts in Desperation And Dies Playing the Lender" – New York Times story about acts of fraud committed by Tarkio College

 
Buildings and structures in Atchison County, Missouri
Educational institutions established in 1883
Educational institutions disestablished in 1992
Education in Atchison County, Missouri
1883 establishments in Missouri
Defunct private universities and colleges in Missouri